Yes Campaign is a Catalan campaign made up of different organisations and individuals campaigning in favor for a Yes vote in the 2017 Catalan independence referendum. It was launched on 3 August 2017.

The campaign is promoted by the Catalan National Assembly and includes Òmnium Cultural, Association of Municipalities for Independence, Catalan European Democratic Party, Republican Left of Catalonia, Popular Unity Candidacy, Democrats of Catalonia, Left Movement and Catalan Solidarity for Independence.

See also
 Catalan independence movement

References

External links 
 

2017 in Catalonia
Political campaigns
Catalan independence movement